Lake Isabella (formerly, Isabella) is a census-designated place (CDP) in the southern Sierra Nevada, in Kern County, California, United States.

The population was 3,466 at the 2010 census, up from 3,315 at the 2000 census.

Geography

Lake Isabella is at the confluence of the North and South Forks of the Kern River. These rivers are 'wild', in that they are not controlled by any dam upstream. Upstream on the North Fork white water enthusiasts play in the spring and early summer. The famous Golden Trout originate in these rivers in the high country to the north.

History
The area was inhabited for millennia by the indigenous Tübatulabal and Owens Valley Paiute. Gold was discovered nearby in 1853, leading to a gold rush and the founding of Keyesville. The 1863 Keyesville massacre occurred a few miles north.

The town of Isabella was founded by Steven Barton in 1893 and named in honor of Queen Isabella of Spain while her name was popular during the 1893 Columbian Exposition. The Isabella post office, which had opened in 1896, operated at the new site; the name was changed to Lake Isabella in 1957.

The dam's reservoir also inundated the original site of Kernville. Like Isabella, it was relocated, along with several of its historic buildings, to higher ground.

The area is a joy for hikers, boaters, water skiers, fishermen, birders, hunters, wind surfers, kayakers, and other outdoor recreationists. Tourist trade is a major part of the area's economy.

Demographics

2010
At the 2010 census Lake Isabella had a population of 3,466. The racial makeup of Lake Isabella was 3,069 (88.5%) White, 6 (0.2%) African American, 96 (2.8%) Native American, 18 (0.5%) Asian, 7 (0.2%) Pacific Islander, 73 (2.1%) from other races, and 197 (5.7%) from two or more races. Hispanic or Latino of any race were 339 people (9.8%).

The whole population lived in households, no one lived in non-institutionalized group quarters and no one was institutionalized.

There were 1,621 households, 384 (23.7%) had children under the age of 18 living in them, 566 (34.9%) were opposite-sex married couples living together, 218 (13.4%) had a female householder with no husband present, 104 (6.4%) had a male householder with no wife present.  There were 138 (8.5%) unmarried opposite-sex partnerships, and 14 (0.9%) same-sex married couples or partnerships. 592 households (36.5%) were one person and 299 (18.4%) had someone living alone who was 65 or older. The average household size was 2.14.  There were 888 families (54.8% of households); the average family size was 2.76.

The age distribution was 666 people (19.2%) under the age of 18, 299 people (8.6%) aged 18 to 24, 653 people (18.8%) aged 25 to 44, 1,106 people (31.9%) aged 45 to 64, and 742 people (21.4%) who were 65 or older.  The median age was 47.2 years. For every 100 females, there were 95.2 males.  For every 100 females age 18 and over, there were 91.9 males.

There were 2,164 housing units at an average density of 97.8 per square mile, of the occupied units 1,019 (62.9%) were owner-occupied and 602 (37.1%) were rented. The homeowner vacancy rate was 5.6%; the rental vacancy rate was 8.5%.  2,088 people (60.2% of the population) lived in owner-occupied housing units and 1,378 people (39.8%) lived in rental housing units.

2000
At the 2000 census there were 3,315 people, 1,526 households, and 877 families in the CDP. The racial makeup of the CDP was 90.44% White, 0.06% Black or African American, 1.90% Native American, 0.81% Asian, 0.06% Pacific Islander, 2.50% from other races, and 4.22% from two or more races.  6.76% of the population were Hispanic or Latino of any race.
Of the 1,526 households 21.9% had children under the age of 18 living with them, 41.9% were married couples living together, 10.3% had a female householder with no husband present, and 42.5% were non-families. 37.6% of households were one person and 22.0% were one person aged 65 or older.  The average household size was 2.17 and the average family size was 2.83.

The age distribution was 23.0% under the age of 18, 6.0% from 18 to 24, 19.7% from 25 to 44, 23.5% from 45 to 64, and 27.8% 65 or older.  The median age was 46 years. For every 100 females, there were 89.2 males.  For every 100 females age 18 and over, there were 84.4 males.

The median household income was $19,813 and the median family income  was $24,800. Males had a median income of $24,896 versus $18,523 for females. The per capita income for the CDP was $11,452.  About 18.2% of families and 20.5% of the population were below the poverty line, including 25.2% of those under age 18 and 13.8% of those age 65 or over.

References

External links

Census-designated places in Kern County, California
Kern River Valley
Populated places in the Sierra Nevada (United States)
Census-designated places in California